The Eddie Gilbert Memorial Brawl was an annual professional wrestling event held between 1996 and 1999 as a tribute to wrestler Eddie Gilbert and featured talent from the National Wrestling Alliance, World Wrestling Federation and Extreme Championship Wrestling, as well as local and established independent wrestlers. Each year, the event would feature the Gilbert family receiving a plaque from promoter Dennis Coralluzzo. In 1998, the show came under some criticism when Coralluzzo was alleged to have used the in-ring plaque presentation to publicly attack Paul Heyman, as did the Gilbert family, provoking a verbal altercation between himself and ECW fans in attendance.

The show was also attended by older veterans who had worked with Gilbert during his career and appeared both during the show and at a special "tribute dinner" and wrestling convention held during the weekend. Mick Foley made an appearance at the first convention and later expressed his regret in not wrestling the first show. Brian Hildebrand was honored at the banquet two years later.

Although the original shows were promoted by Coralluzzo and NWA New Jersey, other promotions have held similar events including IWA Mid-South in 1998 and Southeastern Championship Wrestling in 2002. It has been suggested by some in the industry, such as former wrestlers Bob Blackburn and Buddy Landel, that the shows have been used to financially exploit Gilbert's death. Landel, a regular performer for the NWA shows, initially declined Ian Rotten's offer to appear for IWA Mid South's memorial show for this reason.

Show results

First Annual Eddie Gilbert Memorial Brawl
February 3, 1996 in Cherry Hill, New Jersey (The Armory)

Second Annual Eddie Gilbert Memorial Brawl
April 12, 1997 in Cherry Hill, New Jersey (West High School)

Third Annual Eddie Gilbert Memorial Brawl
February 28, 1998 in Philadelphia, Pennsylvania (Radisson Hotel)

Fourth Annual Eddie Gilbert Memorial Brawl
October 2, 1999 in Vineland, New Jersey (Vineland High School)

See also
List of professional wrestling conventions

References

Further reading
Lister, John. Slamthology: Collected Wrestling Writings 1991-2004. Adlibbed Ltd., 2005. 

Professional wrestling memorial shows
1996 in professional wrestling
1997 in professional wrestling
1998 in professional wrestling
1999 in professional wrestling